Norbert Alexandre Haymamba (born 30 March 1999) is a Cameroonian professional footballer who plays as a goalkeeper.

Playing career
Haymamba is a youth product of the Cameroonian club Brasseries du Cameroun, and moved to the reserves of Rio Ave in 2018. In 2022 he will move to Kapfenberg to the Austrian Second Division „Liga Zwa“.In 2019, he began his senior career with Oleiros in the Campeonato de Portugal before transferring to the Primeira Liga club Arouca on 21 August 2020. He made his professional debut with Arouca in a 2–1 Primeira Liga win over Boavista on 27 November 2021.

References

External links
 
 

1999 births
Living people
Footballers from Yaoundé
Cameroonian footballers
Association football goalkeepers
A.R.C. Oleiros players
F.C. Arouca players
Primeira Liga players
Campeonato de Portugal (league) players
Cameroonian expatriate footballers
Cameroonian expatriate sportspeople in Portugal
Expatriate footballers in Portugal